Bo Lilja (born 25 December 1950) is a Danish sports shooter. He competed at the 1976 Summer Olympics, the 1984 Summer Olympics and the 1992 Summer Olympics.

References

1950 births
Living people
Danish male sport shooters
Olympic shooters of Denmark
Shooters at the 1976 Summer Olympics
Shooters at the 1984 Summer Olympics
Shooters at the 1992 Summer Olympics
Sportspeople from Helsingborg